Andrzej Jurczyński (born 10 November 1950) is a former international speedway rider from Poland.

Speedway career 
Jurczyński won a bronze medal at the Speedway World Team Cup in the 1974 Speedway World Team Cup.

World final appearances

World Team Cup
 1974 -  Chorzów, Silesian Stadium (with Zenon Plech / Jan Mucha / Andrzej Tkocz / Jerzy Szczakiel) - 3rd - 13pt (3)

References 

1950 births
Polish speedway riders
Living people
Sportspeople from Częstochowa